Venezuela competed at the 2000 Summer Olympics in Sydney, Australia. 50 competitors, 36 men and 14 women, took part in 49 events in 17 sports.

Athletics

Key
Note–Ranks given for track events are within the athlete's heat only
Q = Qualified for the next round
q = Qualified for the next round as a fastest loser or, in field events, by position without achieving the qualifying target
NR = National record
N/A = Round not applicable for the event
Bye = Athlete not required to compete in round

Men
Track & road events

Boxing

Cycling

Road Cycling
Men

Track Cycling

Sprint

Time trial

Diving

Men

Women

Fencing

One male fencer represented Venezuela in 2000.

Men

Gymnastics

Artistic
Women

Judo

Men

Women

Sailing

Men

Shooting

Men

Women

Swimming

Men

Synchronized swimming

Table tennis

Taekwondo

Tennis

Men

Women

Triathlon

Men

Weightlifting

Men

Women

Wrestling

Men's Greco-Roman

See also
 Venezuela at the 1999 Pan American Games

Notes

Wallechinsky, David (2004). The Complete Book of the Summer Olympics (Athens 2004 Edition). Toronto, Canada. . 
International Olympic Committee (2001). The Results. Retrieved 12 November 2005.
Sydney Organising Committee for the Olympic Games (2001). Official Report of the XXVII Olympiad Volume 1: Preparing for the Games. Retrieved 20 November 2005.
Sydney Organising Committee for the Olympic Games (2001). Official Report of the XXVII Olympiad Volume 2: Celebrating the Games. Retrieved 20 November 2005.
Sydney Organising Committee for the Olympic Games (2001). The Results. Retrieved 20 November 2005.
International Olympic Committee Web Site

References

Nations at the 2000 Summer Olympics
2000 Summer Olympics
Olympics